The Top of the World is a 1925 American silent drama film directed by George Melford and starring James Kirkwood, Sr., Anna Q. Nilsson, Joseph Kilgour, Mary Mersch, Raymond Hatton, Sheldon Lewis, and Charles A. Post. Based on a 1920 novel of the same title by Ethel M. Dell, the screenplay was written by Jack Cunningham. It was released on February 9, 1925, by Paramount Pictures.

Cast

Preservation
With no prints of The Top of the World located in any film archives, it is a lost film.

References

External links

Poster at gettyimages.com

1925 films
1925 drama films
Silent American drama films
American silent feature films
Films directed by George Melford
American black-and-white films
Films based on works by Ethel M. Dell
Films based on British novels
Paramount Pictures films
Lost American films
1925 lost films
Lost drama films
1920s American films